Mohammad Noman may refer to:
 Mohammad Noman (politician)
 Mohammad Noman (educationist)